The 2010 Bulgarian Cup Final was played at the Lovech Stadium in Lovech on 5 May 2010, and was contested by Beroe Stara Zagora and Chernomorets Pomorie. The match was won by Beroe Stara Zagora, with Doncho Atanasov scoring the crucial goal in the 92nd minute.

Match

Details

See also
2009–10 A Group

References 

Bulgarian Cup finals
Cup Final